Lucy Miller Mitchell (1899 – 2002) was an early childhood education specialist and community activist from Boston who was instrumental in getting the state to regulate day care centers. She is credited with modernizing the day care system in Massachusetts.

Early life and education

She was born in Daytona Beach, Florida in 1899, the youngest of four children. Howard Thurman, who lived nearby, was a childhood playmate. She attended the Daytona Normal and Industrial Institute and graduated from Talladega College in 1922. That same year, as a teacher at the Daytona School, she witnessed a confrontation between the school's founder, Mary McLeod Bethune, and the Ku Klux Klan.

Soon afterwards she married attorney Joseph S. Mitchell and moved to the Roxbury neighborhood of Boston. While raising her two children, Joseph and Laura, she took courses at the Nursery Training School with nursery school movement pioneer Abigail Adams Eliot. She earned a master's degree in early childhood education from Boston University in 1935.

Her husband was assistant attorney general of Massachusetts from 1945 to 1949; he was also a playwright. Her son, Joseph S. Mitchell, Jr., became the second African American to serve as a superior court judge in Massachusetts when he was appointed by governor John Volpe in 1966.

Career

From 1932 to 1953 she directed the nursery school at Robert Gould Shaw House, a settlement house and community center. Under her direction it became a model school to which student teachers were sent to observe and practice. She was a co-founder of Associated Day Care Services of Metropolitan Boston, and later served as its educational director and acting executive director.

In 1953 she was appointed by the governor of Massachusetts, Christian Herter, to a special commission to study day care licensing. After years of research and activism, a state licensing law was finally passed in 1962 under Governor Volpe. Mitchell then worked with the Massachusetts Department of Education to develop affordable training courses for day care workers. She is considered a pioneer in early childhood education.

After retiring from Associated Day Care Services of Metropolitan Boston, Mitchell trained Peace Corps volunteers to work with children; consulted for the national Head Start Program and helped implement the program in Boston; helped Muriel Snowden establish Freedom House in Roxbury; was president of the Boston Association for the Education of Young Children; and served on the boards of various agencies, including the Boston YWCA and United Community Services of Metropolitan Boston. She died in a nursing home in New Rochelle, New York, the day before her 103rd birthday.

Honors and awards

In 1977 an oral history of Mitchell's life was recorded for the Black Women Oral History Project at the Schlesinger Library of Radcliffe College. She received a Distinguished Citizen Award from the City of Boston in 1979. She was awarded an honorary degree by Wheelock College in 1988. Her home on Waumbeck Street in Roxbury is a stop on the Boston Women's Heritage Trail.

Publications

External links
Lucy Miller Mitchell Papers, 1919-1988  MC 812; Vt-253. Schlesinger Library, Radcliffe Institute, Harvard University, Cambridge, Mass.
Lucy Mitchell Interview Transcript. OH-31. Schlesinger Library, Radcliffe Institute, Harvard University, Cambridge, Mass.
Schlesinger Library Luncheon Series audio collection, 1979-1987 T-118; Vt-253. Schlesinger Library, Radcliffe Institute, Harvard University, Cambridge, Mass.

References

1899 births
2002 deaths
20th-century American educators
People from Roxbury, Boston
Boston University School of Education alumni
Black Women Oral History Project
African-American centenarians
American centenarians
Women centenarians
20th-century African-American educators
21st-century African-American people
20th-century African-American women
21st-century African-American women